The 3rd Curtis Cup Match was played on 6 May 1936 on the King's Course at Gleneagles Hotel in Auchterarder, Perthshire, Scotland. The match ended in a tie at 4 each and the United States, as the holders, retained the trophy.

The final match to finish was between Jessie Anderson and Leona Cheney. America led 4–3 and had already retained the Cup but Britain could still tie the contest. Anderson and Cheney were all square after 17 holes. Cheney took 5 at the last but Anderson holed a putt of 7 or 8 yards for a 4, to win her match and tie the contest.

Format
The contest was played in a single day, with three foursomes in the morning and six singles matches in the afternoon, a total of 9 points.

Each of the 9 matches was worth one point in the larger team competition. If a match was all square after the 18th hole extra holes were not played. Rather, each side earned  a point toward their team total. The team that accumulated at least 5 points won the competition.

Teams
Eight players for Great Britain & Ireland and USA participated in the event.

Bridget Newell and Phyllis Wade did not play in any matches.

Aniela Goldthwaite and Marion Miley did not play in any matches.

Morning foursomes

Afternoon singles

References

Curtis Cup
Golf tournaments in Scotland
International sports competitions hosted by Scotland
Sport in Perth and Kinross
Curtis Cup
Curtis Cup
Curtis Cup